List of Montenegrins is a list of notable people who were Montenegrin by their personal or ancestral ethnicity.

Architecture
Svetlana Kana Radević

Literature

Writers
Čedo Vuković
Mihailo Lalić
Milisav Popović
Elijah Monte Radlovic
Petar II Petrović-Njegoš
Mirko Kovač
Radovan Zogović
Marko Miljanov Popović
Andrija Paltašić
Milovan Đilas
Dejan Stojanović
Novak Kilibarda
Dragan Radulović
Borislav Jovanović
Sreten Asanović
Nikola Petanović
Andrija Paltašić, writer, editor and publisher
Željko Milović

Poets
Petar II Petrović Njegoš
Mirko Petrović-Njegoš
Marko Miljanov
Andrija Zmajević
Tanja Bakić
Radovan Zogović
Stjepan Mitrov Ljubiša
Vitomir Vito Nikolić
Ivan Paltašić
Dejan Stojanović
Jovan Sundečić
Andrija Radulović
Giovanni Bona Boliris (Ivan Bolica or Ivan Bunić)
Mariano Bolizza
Aleksandar Bečanović

Historians
Živko Andrijašević

Journalists
Dragan Radulović

Chroniclers
Nikola Bošković

Art

Painters
Miodrag "Dado" Đurić
Uroš Tošković
Petar Lubarda
Milo Milunović
Tripo Kokolja
Boris Dragojević
Andrija Paltašić
Miloš Vusković
Gojko Berkuljan
Vojo Stanić
Mario Maskareli

Sculptors
Vojo Stanić
Risto Stijović
Yevgeny Vuchetich

Film and theatre

Actors/actresses
Mila Jovović
John Malkovich
Branimir Popović
Dubravka Vukotić
Momčilo Otašević
Stefan Kapičić
Milutin Karadžić
Slavko Labović
Veljko Mandić
Vladimir Popović

Film directors
Živko Nikolić
Veljko Bulajić
Ivan Kraljević
Željko Sošić

Cartoonists
Dušan Vukotić

Cinematographers
Bojan Bazelli

Music

Classical
Miloš Karadaglić
Nastasja Vojinović 
Janko Nilović
Ratimir Martinović
Jovo Ivanišević
Milivoje Mićo Božović
Danijel Cerović

Pop
Andrea Demirović
Knez
Slavko Kalezić
Vanja Radovanović
Nina Žižić
Sergej Ćetković
Danijel Alibabić
Marko Prentić
Bojan Marović
Stefan Filipović
Nina Petković
Stevan Faddy
Daniel
Marinko Pavićević

Rock
Miladin Šobić
Dragoljub Đuričić

Jazz
Rambo Amadeus

Hip-Hop
Noyz
Niggor
Senidah
Barska Stoka (hip-hop group)

Folk
Dado Polumenta
Šako Polumenta
Boban Rajović

Fashion models
Karnela Scekic
Marija Vujović
Filip Kapisoda
Tara Emad

Military

Admirals
Matija Zmajević
Vladimir Barović

Captains
Krsto Zmajević

Commanders
Peko Dapčević
Vlado Dapčević
Radola Gajda
Marko Popović

Generals
Anto Gvozdenović
Krsto Zrnov Popović
Janko Vukotić

Majors

Krsto Zrnov Popović
Marko Popović

Seamen
Matija Zmajević

Explorers
Ivan Visin

Voivodes
Novica Cerović
Mirko Petrović-Njegoš
Marko Miljanov Popović
Gavro Vuković

Politicians

Prime Ministers
Duško Marković
Igor Lukšić
Milo Đukanović
Filip Vujanović
Jovan Plamenac
Anto Gvozdenović
Evgenije Popović
Lazar Mijušković
Andrija Radović
Milutin Vučinić
Marko Orlandić
Radivoje Brajović
Blažo Jovanović

Presidents
Milo Đukanović
Filip Vujanović
Dragan Kujović

Other

Aleksandar Bogdanović
Jorge Capitanich
Slavko Perović
Andrija Popović
Milica Pejanović-Đurišić
Predrag Bošković
Nikola Janović
Dragiša Burzan
Dragan Đurović
Draginja Vuksanović
Ranko Krivokapić
Ivan Brajović
Svetozar Vukmanović
Novak Kilibarda
Sekula Drljević

Foreign figures of Montenegrin descent
People with Montenegrin ancestry but high-ranked officials of other countries:

Jorge Milton Capitanich, Argentinian Senator
Michael Anthony Stepovich, Governor of Alaska
Melissa Bean Luburic, Democratic Party representative in the United States of America House of Representatives
Mark Brnovich, Attorney General of Arizona
Oliver Vujović, Secretary General SEEMO; Austria

Senators
Novica Cerović

Businesspeople
Duško Knežević
Aco Đukanović
Slobodan Šaranović

Royalty

Princes
Prince Boris I Petrović-Njegoš of Montenegro
Crown Prince Danilo I Aleksandar Petrović-Njegoš of Montenegro
Prince Michael I Petrović-Njegoš of Montenegro
Prince Milo Petrović-Njegoš of Montenegro
Prince Mirko Dimitri Petrović-Njegoš of Montenegro
Prince Nikola II Petrović-Njegoš of Montenegro

Prince-Bishops (Vladikas)

Princesses
Princess Altinaï of Montenegro
Princess Anastasia Petrović-Njegoš of Montenegro/Grand Duchess Anastasia Nicholaievna of Montenegro
Princess Milica Petrović-Njegoš of Montenegro/Grand Duchess Militsa Nicholaievna of Montenegro
Princess Jelena Petrović-Njegoš of Montenegro/Queen Elena of Italy
Princess Ljubica (Zorka) Petrović-Njegoš of Montenegro/ Ljubica (Zorka) of the Kingdom of Serbs, Croats, and Slovenes
Princess Anna Petrović-Njegoš of Montenegro
Princess Ksenija Petrović-Njegoš of Montenegro

Historical Figures

Balšić family
Balša I
Đurađ I
Balša II
Đurađ II
Balša III

Crnojević family
Đurađ III Crnojević
Stefan I Crnojević
Ivan I Crnojević
Đurađ IV Crnojević
Đurađ V Crnojević
Staniša Crnojević
Arsenije III Crnojević

Petrović family
Danilo I Petrović-Njegoš
Petar I Petrović Njegoš
Petar II Petrović Njegoš
Nicholas I of Montenegro

Religion

Popes
Pope Sixtus V

Saints
Petar I Petrović-Njegoš/Saint Peter of Cetinje
Petar II Petrović-Njegoš/Saint Peter II of Cetinje
Saint Vasilije Ostroški
Saint Jovan Vladimir
Saint Stefan Štiljanović
Saint Stefan of Piperi

Religious figures
Andrija Zmajević
Vicko Bujović
Leopold Mandić (Saint)
Ozana of Kotor (beatified)

Sports

Football
Adam Marušić
Aleksandar Boljević
Andjelo Rudović
Dejan Damjanović
Dejan Savićević
Predrag Mijatović
Sead Hakšabanović
Mirko Vučinić
Marko Vešović
Nikola Vukčević (footballer, born 1991) 
Stevan Jovetić
Luka Đorđević
Danijel Petković
Marko Baša
Stefan Savić
Stefan Mugoša
Simon Vukčević
Vladimir Jovović
Žarko Tomašević
Mirsad Huseinović
Refik Sabanadzovic

Basketball

Boris Bakić
Miloš Borisov
Ognjen Čarapić
Predrag Drobnjak
Bojan Dubljević
Nemanja Đurišić
Marko Todorović
Blagota Sekulić
Nikola Vučević
Nikola Mirotić
Nikola Ivanović
Zoran Nikolić
Halil Kanacević
Nikola Pavličević
Nikola Peković
Nemanja Radović
Velibor Radović (born 1972), Montenegrin-Israeli professional basketball player
Taylor Rochestie (born 1985) American-Montenegrin player in the Israel Basketball Premier League

Coaches
Gregg Popovich
Dejan Radonjić
Zvezdan Mitrovic
Vlado Scepanovic

Handball
Petar Kapisoda
Alen Muratović
Katarina Bulatović
Majda Mehmedović
Jovanka Radičević
Milena Raičević
Bojana Popović
Marina Rajčić
Đurđina Jauković
Vuko Borozan
Sonja Barjaktarović
Maja Savić
Anđela Bulatović
Marija Jovanović
Ema Ramusović
Radmila Miljanić-Petrović
Andrea Klikovac
Žarko Marković
Vasko Ševaljević
Vladan Lipovina
Stevan Vujović

Water Polo
Nikola Janović
Mlađan Janović
Veljko Uskoković
Vladimir Gojković
Aleksandar Ivović
Draško Brguljan
Filip Klikovac
Jovan Vavic (lived in Montenegro)

Tennis
Miloš Raonić
Danka Kovinić

Martial Arts

Boxing
Dejan Zlatičanin
Vukašin Dobrašinović
Boško Drašković
Milorad Gajović
Miodrag Perunović
Janko Vučinić
Milorad Žižić

Kickboxing
Ivan Strugar
Goran Radonjić

Judo
Srđan Mrvaljević
Dragomir Bečanović
Nicholas Delpopolo

American football
Novo Bojović

Scientists

Physics
Dragan Hajduković 
Sanja Damjanović

Computer science
Nenad Medvidović

Electrical engineering
Ljubiša Stanković

Linguists
Vojislav Nikčević

Other
Nero Wolfe fictional detective created by American writer Rex Stout

References